Gerhard Christoph von Krogh (10 October 1785 – 12 April 1860) was a Danish nobleman and military officer. He served as a General and was the Danish Supreme Commander during the First Schleswig War. His victory at the Battle of Isted, was at its time the largest in Scandinavian history. The battle's anniversary on the 25th of July, is the military flag day in Denmark.

He was the son of Privy Councillor, Friderich Ferdinand von Krogh and Rosine Elisabeth von Frankenburg und Proschlitz. He married Komtesse Siegfriede Victorine Knuth-Christiansdal on 6 February 1813 at the Citadels Church in Copenhagen. Together they had a residence in the Prince's Mansion in Copenhagen from 1817 until 1853.

Legacy

The memorial Isted Lion is partly dedicated to von Krogh. Kroghsgade in Århus is named after him.

References

1785 births
1860 deaths
Danish military personnel
Danish generals
Danish nobility
People of the First Schleswig War
Recipients of the Order of St. Anna, 1st class
Grand Crosses of the Order of the Dannebrog
Von Krogh family